The 1960 United States presidential election in Delaware took place on November 8, 1960, as part of the 1960 United States presidential election. State voters chose three representatives, or electors, to the Electoral College, who voted for president and vice president.

Delaware was won by Senator John F. Kennedy (D–Massachusetts), running with Senator Lyndon B. Johnson, with 50.63% of the popular vote against incumbent Vice President Richard Nixon (R–California), running with United States Ambassador to the United Nations Henry Cabot Lodge, Jr., with 49.00% of the popular vote.

Results

See also
 United States presidential elections in Delaware

References

Delaware
1960
1960 Delaware elections